Michael J. Tougias is a writer who was born in Longmeadow, Massachusetts in 1955. He writes about maritime, travel, and adventure topics.

Career 
Michael  J. Tougias is a N.Y. Times Bestselling author of 25 books.

An avid fisherman, Tougias became a self-syndicated outdoors writer in 1990. At the time he was also managing a division of a major insurance company. He published the first of 25 books in 1998.

He travels to more than 100 small and large speaking engagements a year to discuss his books and other topics, including "Survival Stories," lessons learned from those who were shipwrecked. U.S. Coast Guardsmen and sailors are frequent audiences; Tougias' last six books have been accounts of historic sea rescues by the Coast Guard, often in the Gulf Stream.

His book The Finest Hours: The True Story Behind the US Coast Guard's Most Daring Rescue (2009), co-authored with Casey Sherman, was adapted as a Disney film by the same name, released in 2016.

Tougias is a frequent guest on NPR programs, The Weather Channel, Fox & Friends, 20/20, and national talk shows.

Education
He attended Boston College (1973–74) and graduated from Saint Michael's College in Vermont in 1977.

Personal life
He lives in Massachusetts and Florida.

He has a daughter, Kristin, with whom he wrote a memoir entitled The Cringe Chronicles.

Works

Novels 

 Until I Have No Country (1996)

Non-fiction 

Autobiographies
 Theres A Porcupine In My Outhouse: Misadventures Of A Mountain Man Wannabe (2002, with Mike Tougias), memoirs 
 The Cringe Chronicles: Mortifying Misadventures with My Dad: A Memoir (2014, with Kristin Tougias), memoirs 

Biographies
 Derek's Gift: A True Story of Love, Courage and Lessons Learned (2014, with Buck Harris), memoirs 

True events
 Ten Hours Until Dawn: The True Story of Heroism and Tragedy Aboard the Can Do (2005, with Frank Quirk Jr.) 
 Young Readers Edition: Into the Blizzard: Heroism at Sea During the Great Blizzard of 1978 (Expected publication: 2019) 
 Fatal Forecast: An Incredible True Tale of Disaster and Survival at Sea (2006) 
 The Finest Hours: The True Story of the U.S. Coast Guard's Most Daring Sea Rescue (2009, with Casey Sherman) 
 Overboard!: A True Blue-Water Odyssey of Disaster and Survival (2010) 
 A Storm Too Soon: A True Story of Disaster, Survival and an Incredible Rescue (2013) 
 Rescue of the Bounty: Disaster and Survival in Superstorm Sandy (2014, with Douglas A. Campbell) 
 So Close to Home: A True Story of an American Family's Fight for Survival During World War II (2016, with Alison O'Leary) 
 True Rescue: A Storm Too Soon: A Remarkable True Survival Story in 80-Foot Seas (2021) 

History
 King Philip's War: The History and Legacy of America's Forgotten Conflict (1999, with Eric B. Schultz) 
 The Blizzard of '78 (2001) 
 Above & Beyond: John F. Kennedy and America's Most Dangerous Cold War Spy Mission (2018, with Casey Sherman) 

Travels
 The Hidden Charles: An Explorer's Guide to the Charles River (1992, with Mike Tougias) 
 Country Roads of Massachusetts (1992) 
 Nature Walks in Eastern Massachusetts series:
 Nature Walks in Eastern Massachusetts: An AMC Country Walks Book (1993) 
 More Nature Walks In Eastern Massachusetts: Discover 47 New Walks Throughout the Area Including Scenic Cape Cod (1998) 
 Nature Walks In Eastern Massachusetts, 2nd: Nature-rich Walks within an Hour of Boston, features the Bay Circuit (1999) 
 Nature Walks In Central Massachusetts: Nature-rich Walks from Worceser County through the Connecticut River Valley (1996, with René Laubach) 
 Quiet Places of Massachusetts (1996) 
 New England Wild Places: Journeys Through the Back Country (1997) 
 Cape Ann - North Shore Recreation Map & Guide (1997) 
 Hunter Travel Guides series:
 Autumn Rambles: New England : An Explorer's Guide to the Best Fall Colors (1998) 
 Nature Walks In Central & Western Massachusetts, 2nd (2000) 
 River Days: Exploring the Connecticut River and its History from Source to Sea (2001) 
 Quabbin: A History and Explorer's Guide (2002) 
 Trailguide: Outdoors in Franklin (2002) 
 Nature Walks South of Boston: AMC Guide to Hiking, Birding, and Exploring Southeastern Massachusetts and Cape Cod (2006) 
 AMC's Best Day Hikes near Boston, 2nd: Four-Season Guide to 60 of the Best Trails in Eastern Massachusetts (2006, with John S. Burk) 
 Good Night Vermont (2007) 
 Inns and Adventures: A History and Explorer's Guide to Vermont, New Hampshire, and the Berkshires (2015, with Alison O'Leary) 

Writing
 Cape Cod: In the Words of Thoreau and Beston (2000)

Adaptations 

 The Finest Hours (2016), film directed by Craig Gillespie, based on non-fiction book The Finest Hours: The True Story of the U.S. Coast Guard's Most Daring Sea Rescue

References

External links 
 
 

1955 births
21st-century travel writers
Living people
Saint Michael's College alumni
People from Longmeadow, Massachusetts
20th-century American novelists
American non-fiction outdoors writers
20th-century American non-fiction writers
American travel writers